Vysoki Bairaky is a village in central Ukraine in Kropyvnytskyi Raion, Kirovohrad Oblast.

Demographics
According to the 1989 census, the population of Vysoki Bairaky was 952 people, of whom 431 were men and 521 women.

Native language as of the Ukrainian Census of 2001:
 Ukrainian 95.80%
 Russian 3.09%
 Romani 0.88%
 Belarusian 0.22%

References

Villages in Kropyvnytskyi Raion